The 68th Infantry Division was a French Army formation during the First and Second World Wars.

First World War
During the war of 1914 to 1918, the division comprised:
206th Infantry Regiment
212nd Infantry Regiment (to February 1917)
234th Infantry Regiment
257th Infantry Regiment (to June 1916)
323rd Infantry Regiment (to June 1916)
344th Infantry Regiment
A battalion of the 73rd Territorial Infantry Regiment (from July 1917)

It was part of the French 2nd, 3rd, 7th, 11th, 13th, 14th, 15th, 16th, 17th, 20th, 21st, 35th, 39th and 40th Corps, during which it participated in the Battle of Morhange, the Battle of Grand Couronne, the Battle of Verdun, the Second Battle of the Marne, and the Meuse-Argonne Offensive.

At various times, the Division was part of the First, Second, Third, Fourth, Fifth, Sixth, Seventh, Eighth, and Tenth French Armies.

Second World War
During the Battle of France in May 1940, the division contained the following units:

224th Infantry Regiment
225th Infantry Regiment
341st Infantry Regiment
59th Reconnaissance Battalion
89th Artillery Regiment
289th Artillery Regiment

It was a "Series B" Reserve division, containing older reservists. The division was used to defend the coast of northern France.

References

Infantry Division, 68th
Infantry Division, 68th
Infantry divisions of France